André Jacobus Watson (born 24 April 1958) is a South African former rugby union referee. He officiated a record number of finals in the Rugby World Cup (two), the Currie Cup (seven) and Super Rugby (five).

Biography
Watson was born in Germiston, Transvaal and attended school at Maria van Riebeeck Primary and Goudrif High School. He later attended Stellenbosch University and the University of the Witwatersrand before working as an engineer.

Playing career
As a youth Watson played representative rugby for Transvaal Schools XV. While studying at university he played for Stellenbosch University and the University of the Witwatersrand.

Refereeing career
He took up refereeing in 1987, becoming a full-time referee in 1995.

Provincial rugby
During his career he refereed 100 Currie Cup matches including seven cup finals which, as of 2010, is the most by a referee.

Watson refereed five Super Rugby finals which is, as of 2011, a record.

International rugby
He made his international debut in 1996 in a match between Australia and Canada. Watson refereed the first of two Rugby World Cup finals when he took charge of the 1999 Rugby World Cup Final between Australia and France in Cardiff.

His second World Cup final was the 2003 Rugby World Cup Final between Australia and England in Sydney. He remains the only referee to have officiated in two finals.

He announced his retirement prior to the July 2004 match between Australia and the Pacific Islanders. He made a comeback three months later,  refereeing the first match of the qualification round for 2007 Rugby World Cup between Andorra and Norway.

Post-refereeing career

He was appointed as the Manager of Referees for the South African Rugby Union in 2011. On 3 July 2015, SARU announced that his employment has been terminated after the Commission for Conciliation, Mediation and Arbitration decided that a number of grievances lodged against Watson proved to be valid.

References

Living people
1958 births
South African rugby union referees
Stellenbosch University alumni
University of the Witwatersrand alumni
People from Germiston
Rugby World Cup referees
Currie Cup referees
Super Rugby referees
South African rugby union players
The Rugby Championship referees
Six Nations Championship referees